Pelturagonia nigrilabris, the blacklipped eyebrow lizard, is a species of agamid lizard. It is found in Indonesia and Malaysia.

References

Pelturagonia
Reptiles of Indonesia
Reptiles of Malaysia
Reptiles described in 1864
Taxa named by Wilhelm Peters
Taxobox binomials not recognized by IUCN
Reptiles of Borneo